The 2018 DC Solar 300 was the 26th stock car race of the 2018 NASCAR Xfinity Series season, the final race of the regular season, and the inaugural iteration of the event. The race was held on Saturday, September 15, 2018, in North Las Vegas, Nevada at Las Vegas Motor Speedway, a 1.5 miles (2.4 km) permanent D-shaped oval racetrack. The race took the scheduled 200 laps to complete. At race's end, Ross Chastain of Chip Ganassi Racing would dominate, redeeming himself from the 2018 Sport Clips Haircuts VFW 200 to win his first ever NASCAR Xfinity Series career win and his first and only win of the season. To fill out the podium, Justin Allgaier of JR Motorsports and Cole Custer of Stewart-Haas Racing with Biagi-DenBeste would finish second and third, respectively.

Background 

Las Vegas Motor Speedway, located in Clark County, Nevada outside the Las Vegas city limits and about 15 miles northeast of the Las Vegas Strip, is a 1,200-acre (490 ha) complex of multiple tracks for motorsports racing. The complex is owned by Speedway Motorsports, Inc., which is headquartered in Charlotte, North Carolina.

Entry list

Practice

First practice 
The first practice session would occur on Friday, September 14, at 12:05 PM PST, and would last for 40 minutes.

Second and final practice 
The second and final practice session, sometimes referred to as Happy Hour, would occur on Friday, September 14, at 2:05 PM PST, and would last for 45 minutes.

Qualifying 
Qualifying would take place on Saturday, March 3, at 10:05 AM PST. Since Las Vegas Motor Speedway is under 2 miles (3.2 km), the qualifying system was a multi-car system that included three rounds. The first round was 15 minutes, where every driver would be able to set a lap within the 15 minutes. Then, the second round would consist of the fastest 24 cars in Round 1, and drivers would have 10 minutes to set a lap. Round 3 consisted of the fastest 12 drivers from Round 2, and the drivers would have 5 minutes to set a time. Whoever was fastest in Round 3 would win the pole.

No drivers would fail to qualify.

Full qualifying results

Race results 
Stage 1 Laps: 45

Stage 2 Laps: 45

Stage 3 Laps: 110

References 

2018 NASCAR Xfinity Series
NASCAR races at Las Vegas Motor Speedway
September 2018 sports events in the United States
2018 in sports in Nevada